Labico is a  (municipality) of about 6,200 inhabitants in the Metropolitan City of Rome in the Italian region of Latium, located about  southeast of Rome.

Known as Lugnano until 1872, it takes its current name from the ancient Labicum, although it is more likely that the modern town was the location of Bolae, the city that fought Rome around the 5th century BC.

References

External links
 Official website

Cities and towns in Lazio